The Ojibway Club is an island community centre located in Pointe au Baril, Ontario, Canada. The club's building is one of few remaining turn-of-the-century lodges built in that part of Ontario.

The Ojibway began as a hotel built in 1906 by Hamilton Davis, in the era of grand summer resorts. Mr. Davis’ dream was to create a focal point for the community and to welcome his guests to this unique island neighborhood. 
As E.R.A. Architects, Inc. described it in an architectural heritage report, "The Ojibway is an important remaining example of the large wooden hotels that served a privileged clientele wanting restorative forays into the near wilderness, with all the comforts of home."
The building is one of ten remaining such lodges in the region, of over a hundred originally built. 
In 1942, the Pointe au Baril Islanders' Association bought the hotel from Mr. Davis. The nonprofit Ojibway Club (now known as the Ojibway Heritage Society) has managed the property since 1958.

Today the Ojibway is the centre of summer activity in the Pointe au Baril Island community for both children and adults. A full-service destination for cottagers and boaters alike, the Ojibway offers a restaurant, grocery store, gift shop and gas docks services for all who visit.  The club is maintained by its members, who enjoy access to five tennis courts, summer day camp for children and many social functions throughout the summer months.  Other social activities include art shows, dances, weekly dinners and a semi-annual auction.  The summer camp helps children develop the skills they need for enjoying summer life in the area by providing lessons on sailing, canoeing, and swimming, Arts and crafts, tennis, archery and other similar activities are also taught.

Currently the Ojibway Club does not act as a hotel for guests but is used for social functions and office work. However, there are still 4 rental cottages on the property: Pinewood, Basswood, Elmwood and Birchwood.

References

Community centres in Canada